William Copeland Borlase  (5 April 1848 – 31 March 1899) was a British antiquarian and Liberal politician who sat in the House of Commons from 1880 until 1887 when he was ruined by bankruptcy and scandal.

Early life
Borlase was born at Castle Horneck, near Penzance in Cornwall, England, the only son of Samuel Borlase and his wife Mary Anne (née Copeland) Borlase (d. 1882), daughter of William Copeland of Chigwell, Essex.

A member of a wealthy Cornish family, Borlase's early life was much influenced by the archaeological work of his great-great-grandfather, Dr. William Borlase the Cornish historian. Young Borlase visited many of the ancient sites in Cornwall and in 1863 and supervised the excavations of the re-discovered prehistoric settlement and fogou at Carn Euny. Although Borlase produced many sketches he commissioned fellow Cornish antiquarian John Thomas Blight to do the engravings for the report.

Borlase was educated at Winchester College and Trinity College, Oxford.

Career
He was called to the bar at Inner Temple in 1882 and was JP for Cornwall and a Deputy Warden of the Stannaries of Cornwall and Devon.

In the 1880 general election, Borlase was elected Liberal Member of Parliament for East Cornwall, until the seat was divided in the Redistribution of Seats Act 1885. In the 1885 general election, he was elected MP for St Austell. In 1886, he was made Parliamentary Secretary to the Local Government Board. However he took to fine living. His Portuguese mistress exposed his debts and the scandal brought him ruin and bankruptcy. 

He resigned his seat in the House of Commons on 29 April 1887 and his house at Laregan was put up for auction on 17 May 1887. He left England to work in Ireland as a remittance man and also went on to manage tin mines in Spain and Portugal. The rest of the family disowned him and he died aged 50. His address when he died was 34, Bedford Court Mansions, Bloomsbury, in London.

Works

 , 2 vols.
 , 



 , 3 vols. ,

Death
Borlase died on 31 March 1899 and was buried in the east side of Highgate Cemetery.

Notes

References

Sources

External links

 
 Naenia Cornubiae from The Internet Archive

1848 births
1899 deaths
Burials at Highgate Cemetery
People educated at Winchester College
Alumni of Trinity College, Oxford
Archaeologists from Cornwall
Politicians from Cornwall
English antiquarians
19th-century antiquarians
English archaeologists
Fellows of the Society of Antiquaries of London
Liberal Party (UK) MPs for English constituencies
Members of the Parliament of the United Kingdom for constituencies in Cornwall
People from Penzance
UK MPs 1880–1885
UK MPs 1885–1886
UK MPs 1886–1892
Remittance men
19th-century English politicians
19th-century English writers